Steve Luke (born September 4, 1953) is a former American football safety in the National Football League (NFL). He was drafted by the Green Bay Packers in the fourth round of the 1975 NFL Draft. He played college football at Ohio State.

Professional career
Luke spent his entire career with the Green Bay Packers and was their starting strong safety from 1976 to 1980.

Luke played in every single Packers game in his 6-year career, from 1975 through 1980. That's 90 games overall.

Before the 1981 season, the Packers traded Luke and a draft pick to the Atlanta Falcons for Dewey McClain and Frank Reed, but Luke did not play for the Falcons.

References

1953 births
Living people
American football safeties
Ohio State Buckeyes football players
Green Bay Packers players
Players of American football from Ohio
Sportspeople from Massillon, Ohio